Perfect Day is the sixth album by singer-songwriter and guitarist, Chris Whitley. It is his fifth studio album.

It is a full-length release of cover versions of "love songs". The album was recorded as a trio and is subtitled "Featuring Billy Martin and Chris Wood". Martin and Wood are the rhythm section of Medeski Martin & Wood.

It was produced by Craig Street. The album was recorded live to half-inch two-track recorder by Danny Kopelson at 33 Recording in Brooklyn, New York.

This recording was also released in the Super Audio CD (SACD) format.

Track listing

 "Spanish Harlem Incident" (Bob Dylan) – 2:38
 "Smokestack Lightning" (Chester Burnett – Howlin' Wolf) – 4:41
 "China Gate" (Victor Young, Harold Adamson) – 3:08
 "Drifting" (Jimi Hendrix) – 2:34
 "She's Alright" (McKinley Morganfield – Muddy Waters) – 3:55
 "Perfect Day" (Lou Reed) – 3:31
 "The Wild Ox Moan" (Vera Hall, Ruby Pickens Tartt) – 3:09
 "The Crystal Ship" (John Densmore, Robby Krieger, Ray Manzarek, Jim Morrison – The Doors) – 3:18
 "Spoonful" (Willie Dixon) – 5:04
 "Stones in My Passway" (Robert Johnson) – 3:18
 "4th Time Around" (Bob Dylan) – 3:46

Personnel 
Chris Whitley – vocals and guitar
Chris Wood – acoustic bass and strange overtones
Billy Martin – drums, various percussion and more mud

References 

2000 albums
Covers albums
Chris Whitley albums
Albums produced by Craig Street